George Henry Horton (born 3 July 1993) is a British filmmaker. He is known for psychological thriller film Anne, With Love, starring Mena Suvari and Danielle Harris, and sci-fi horror film Project Dorothy, starring Tim DeZarn. He is also known for his YouTube comedy channel and production company JesterLads.

Personal life

Horton lives in Los Angeles. He is an alumnus of the American Film Institute Conservatory.

Filmography

References

External links

1993 births
Living people
Alumni of King's College London
British directors